Azanicola is a monotypic snout moth genus described by Boris Balinsky in 1991. Its single species, Azanicola adspersa, described by the same author, is found in South Africa.

References

Endemic moths of South Africa
Phycitinae
Monotypic moth genera
Moths of Africa